Zababa  (Sumerian: 𒀭𒍝𒂷𒂷 dza-ba4-ba4) was the tutelary deity of the city of Kish in ancient Mesopotamia. He was a war god. While he was regarded as similar to Ninurta and Nergal, he was never fully conflated with them. His worship is attested from between the Early Dynastic to Achaemenid periods, with the Old Babylonian kings being particularly devoted to him. Starting with the Old Babylonian period, he was regarded as married to the goddess Bau.

Character
Zababa's name has no plausible Sumerian or Semitic etymologies, similar to these of deities such as Alala, Bunene and Bau. His two primary roles were these of a war god and a tutelary deity of Kish. He was already worshiped there in the Early Dynastic period, and references to him as the "king" of that city can be found in texts from Ebla from the third millennium BCE. His status was particularly high during the reign of Hammurabi, when according to Walther it was seemingly Zababa, rather than Ninurta, who should be understood as the primary warrior god in the state pantheon.

Zababa's symbol was an eagle, and he was depicted in symbolic form as a standard with this bird on top.

Worship 
Zababa's main temple was Edubba, located in Kish. Emeteursag, commonly referenced in texts, was a cella dedicated to him rather than a separate temple. A text from the reign of Artaxerxes I mentions the existence of a temple meant for an akitu festival connected to Zababa in Kish as well.

Outside Kish, Zababa temples are attested in Ur (built by Warad-Sin of Larsa), in Tabira, a town near Babylon, and in Assur. He was also among the gods said to "arrive" in Babylon during the city's akitu, alongside deities such as Nabu, Bau, Nergal, Mammitum and Las.

A number of texts praising Hammurabi mention Zababa. In a hymn, he is one of the deities enumerated as responsible for his success, following Anu, Enlil, Shamash, Adad and Marduk, and preceding Inanna. In another hymn, Zababa is referred to as the king's helper. A text from the reign of his successor Samsu-Iluna credits the king with rebuilding the walls of Kish with the help of Zababa and Ishtar, and states that these two deities helped him defeat his enemies. Wilfred G. Lambert notes that these sources are significant as evidence proving "there is no hint of any supremacy of Marduk  within the pantheon" in the Old Babylonian period.

A boundary stone (kudurru) of Nebuchadnezzar I mentions Zababa in a sequence of gods, alongside Anu, Enlil, Marduk, Nabu, Ishtar, Ninurta, Gula, Nergal, Papsukkal, Ishara and "Anu Rabu" (Ishtaran).

Mesopotamian kings named in honor of Zababa include Ur-Zababa ("man of Zababa") of Kish, famous due to his role in the so-called "Sumerian Sargon legend," and Zababa-shuma-iddin, a twelfth century BCE Kassite king of Babylon deposed after a single year on the throne by the Elamite king Shutruk-Nahhunte.

In Kish, Zababa was a popular deity in theophoric names well into Achaemenid times. It has been argued that similar names from other cities can be assumed to indicate emigration of the inhabitants of Kish to other parts to Mesopotamia, similar to Lagamal names pointing at origin of the families of persons bearing them in Dilbat.

Associations with other deities
Zababa's father was Enlil, though Neo-Assyrian ruler Sanherib referred to Zababa as a son of Ashur instead. Initially his wife was Ishtar of Kish, regarded as a distinct goddess from Ishtar of Uruk according to Julia M. Asher-Greve and Joan Goodnick Westenholz. After the Old Babylonian period she was entirely replaced in this role by Bau, though she continued to be worshiped independently from Zababa as well. An early reference to Bau as Zababa's spouse can already be found in Lamentation over the Destruction of Sumer and Ur. Divine couples consisting of healing goddesses and young warrior gods were common in Mesopotamian religion, with the most frequently referenced example being Ninisina and her husband Pabilsag.

Papsukkal was Zababa's sukkal (attendant deity), though he only achieved a degree of notability in the 1st millennium BCE, and due to conflation with Ninshubur (and by extension Ilabrat). Frans Wiggermann notes that it would be plausible for Papsukkal to be Zababa's son, but also that various texts refer to him as son of Anu or Sin and as a descendant of Enmesharra.

Two minor goddesses associated with Zababa's temple Edubba, collectively known as "Daughters of Edubba," were Iqbi-damiq, whose name means "she said 'it is fine!'," and Hussinni, "Remember me!" Pairs of these so-called "divine daughters" are also known from other temples of northern Mesopotamia, such as Emeslam in Kutha (Tadmushtum and Belet-ili), Eibbi-Anum in Dilbat (Ipte-bita and Belet-eanni), Ezida in Borsippa (Kanisurra and Gazbaba) and Esagil in Babylon (Katunna and Sillush-tab). It has been proposed by Andrew R. George that they were imagined as maidservants in the household of the major deity or deities of a given temple.

Zababa and Ninurta shared many epithets, and references to the former using weapons normally associated with the latter or fighting his mythical enemies can be found in various texts. Late lexical texts sometimes apply the names Shulshaga and Igalim to the weapons of Zababa. In sources from the Early Dynastic period, these names instead belonged to the sons of Ningirsu (Ninurta) and Bau, at the time regarded as his wife. A reference to Zababa as "Nergal of Kish" is known too, though this title also could designate a different deity worshiped in the same city, Luhusha ("angry man"). Despite the associations between them, no full equation of Ninurta, Nergal and Zababa occurred, and the same texts, for example hymns and laments, could refer to all three of them as distinct from each other.

A first millennium BCE god list identifies Zababa as "Marduk of the war."

Outside Mesopotamia
According to Gwendolyn Leick, the Hittites used Zababa's name to logographically represent the names of various war gods, such as Hattian Wurunkatte; Hittite and Luwian Hašamili, Iyarri, and Zappana; and Hurrian Aštabi, Hešui, and Nubadig. However, according to Gernot Wilhelm Nubadig was not associated with Zababa, while according to Alfonso Archi the logographic writing of Aštabi's name was NIN.URTA, not ZA.BA.BA. Zababa is nonetheless equated with "Aštabinu", presumably corresponding to Aštabi, in a Babylonian god list. Another war god whose name could be written logographically as ZA.BA.BA in Hittite sources was Šulinkatte, whose origin was Hattian and who was described as having the appearance of a young man. However, he could also be represented by the logogram U.GUR instead.

Citations

Bibliography

External links

 Ancient Mesopotamian Gods and Goddesses: Zababa (god)

Mesopotamian gods
Tutelary deities
War gods